Nazi Germany (officially known as the German Reich from 1933 until 1943, and the Greater German Reich from 1943 to 1945) was the German state between 1933 and 1945, when Adolf Hitler and the Nazi Party controlled the country, transforming it into a dictatorship. Under Hitler's rule, Germany quickly became a totalitarian state where nearly all aspects of life were controlled by the government. The Third Reich, meaning "Third Realm" or "Third Empire", alluded to the Nazi claim that Nazi Germany was the successor to the earlier Holy Roman Empire (800–1806) and German Empire (1871–1918). The Third Reich, which Hitler and the Nazis referred to as the Thousand-Year Reich, ended in May 1945 after just 12 years when the Allies defeated Germany, ending World War II in Europe.

The Nazi Party became the largest party in parliament following the 1932 federal election. Consequently, Hitler was appointed chancellor of Germany, the head of government, on 30 January 1933 by the president and head of state of the Weimar Republic, Paul von Hindenburg. On 23 March 1933, the Enabling Act was enacted to give Hitler's government the power to make and enforce laws without the involvement of the Reichstag or president. The Nazi Party then began to eliminate all political opposition and consolidate its power. Hindenburg died on 2 August 1934, and Hitler became dictator of Germany by merging the offices and powers of the chancellery and presidency. A national referendum held 19 August 1934 confirmed Hitler as sole Führer (leader) of Germany. All power was centralised in Hitler's person and his word became the highest law. The government was not a coordinated, co-operating body, but a collection of factions struggling for power and Hitler's favour. In the midst of the Great Depression, the Nazis restored economic stability and ended mass unemployment using heavy military spending and a mixed economy. Financed by deficit spending, the regime undertook extensive public works projects, including the Autobahnen (motorways), as well as a massive secret rearmament program, forming the Wehrmacht (armed forces). The return to economic stability boosted the regime's popularity.

Racism, Nazi eugenics, and especially antisemitism were central ideological features of the regime. The Germanic peoples were considered by the Nazis to be the master race, the purest branch of the Aryan race. Discrimination and the persecution of Jews and Romani people began in earnest after the seizure of power. The first concentration camps were established in March 1933. Jews, liberals, socialists, communists, and other political opponents and undesirables were imprisoned, exiled, or murdered. Christian churches and citizens that opposed Hitler's rule were oppressed and many leaders imprisoned. Education focused on racial biology, population policy, and fitness for military service. Career and educational opportunities for women were curtailed. Recreation and tourism were organised via the Strength Through Joy program, and the 1936 Summer Olympics showcased Germany on the international stage. Propaganda Minister Joseph Goebbels made effective use of film, mass rallies, and Hitler's hypnotic oratory to influence public opinion. The government controlled artistic expression, promoting specific art forms and banning or discouraging others.

From the latter half of the 1930s, Nazi Germany made increasingly aggressive territorial demands, threatening war if these were not met. The Saarland voted by plebiscite to rejoin Germany in 1935, and in 1936 Hitler sent troops into the Rhineland, which had been demilitarized after World War I. Germany seized Austria in the Anschluss of 1938, and demanded and received the Sudetenland region of Czechoslovakia in that same year. In March 1939, the Slovak state was proclaimed and became a client state of Germany, and the German Protectorate of Bohemia and Moravia was established on the remainder of the occupied Czech lands. Shortly after, Germany pressured Lithuania into ceding the Memel Territory. Germany signed a non-aggression pact with the Soviet Union and invaded Poland on 1 September 1939, launching World War II in Europe. By late 1942, Germany and its European allies in the Axis powers controlled much of Europe and North Africa. Extended offices of the Reichskommissariat took control of Nazi-conquered areas and a German administration was established in the remainder of Poland. Germany exploited the raw materials and labour of both its occupied territories and its allies.

Genocide, mass murder, and large-scale forced labour became hallmarks of the regime. Starting in 1939, hundreds of thousands of German citizens with mental or physical disabilities were murdered in hospitals and asylums. Einsatzgruppen paramilitary death squads accompanied the German armed forces inside the occupied territories and conducted the genocide of millions of Jews and other Holocaust victims. After 1941, millions of others were imprisoned, worked to death, or murdered in Nazi concentration camps and extermination camps. This genocide is known as the Holocaust.

While the German invasion of the Soviet Union in 1941 was initially successful, the Soviet resurgence and entry of the United States into the war meant that the Wehrmacht lost the initiative on the Eastern Front in 1943 and by late 1944 had been pushed back to the pre-1939 border. Large-scale aerial bombing of Germany escalated in 1944 and the Axis powers were driven back in Eastern and Southern Europe. After the Allied invasion of France, Germany was conquered by the Soviet Union from the east and the other Allies from the west, and capitulated on 8 May 1945. Hitler's refusal to admit defeat led to massive destruction of German infrastructure and additional war-related deaths in the closing months of the war. The victorious Allies initiated a policy of denazification and put many of the surviving Nazi leadership on trial for war crimes at the Nuremberg trials.

Name 
Common English terms for the German state in the Nazi era are "Nazi Germany" and the "Third Reich", which Hitler and the Nazis also referred to as the "Thousand-Year Reich" (Tausendjähriges Reich). The latter, a translation of the Nazi propaganda term Drittes Reich, was first used in Das Dritte Reich, a 1923 book by Arthur Moeller van den Bruck. The book counted the Holy Roman Empire (962–1806) as the first Reich and the German Empire (1871–1918) as the second.

Background 

Germany was known as the Weimar Republic during the years 1919 to 1933. It was a republic with a semi-presidential system. The Weimar Republic faced numerous problems, including hyperinflation, political extremism (including violence from left- and right-wing paramilitaries), contentious relationships with the Allied victors of World War I, and a series of failed attempts at coalition government by divided political parties. Severe setbacks to the German economy began after World War I ended, partly because of reparations payments required under the 1919 Treaty of Versailles. The government printed money to make the payments and to repay the country's war debt, but the resulting hyperinflation led to inflated prices for consumer goods, economic chaos, and food riots. When the government defaulted on their reparations payments in January 1923, French troops occupied German industrial areas along the Ruhr and widespread civil unrest followed.

The National Socialist German Workers' Party (Nationalsozialistische Deutsche Arbeiterpartei), commonly known as the Nazi Party, was founded in 1920. It was the renamed successor of the German Workers' Party (DAP) formed one year earlier, and one of several far-right political parties then active in Germany. The Nazi Party platform included destruction of the Weimar Republic, rejection of the terms of the Treaty of Versailles, radical antisemitism, and anti-Bolshevism. They promised a strong central government, increased Lebensraum ("living space") for Germanic peoples, formation of a national community based on race, and racial cleansing via the active suppression of Jews, who would be stripped of their citizenship and civil rights. The Nazis proposed national and cultural renewal based upon the Völkisch movement. The party, especially its paramilitary organisation Sturmabteilung (SA; Storm Detachment), or Brownshirts, used physical violence to advance their political position, disrupting the meetings of rival organisations and attacking their members as well as Jewish people on the streets. Such far-right armed groups were common in Bavaria, and were tolerated by the sympathetic far-right state government of Gustav Ritter von Kahr.

When the stock market in the United States crashed on 24 October 1929, the effect in Germany was dire. Millions were thrown out of work and several major banks collapsed. Hitler and the Nazis prepared to take advantage of the emergency to gain support for their party. They promised to strengthen the economy and provide jobs. Many voters decided the Nazi Party was capable of restoring order, quelling civil unrest, and improving Germany's international reputation. After the federal election of 1932, the party was the largest in the Reichstag, holding 230 seats with 37.4 per cent of the popular vote.

History

Nazi seizure of power 

Although the Nazis won the greatest share of the popular vote in the two Reichstag general elections of 1932, they did not have a majority. Hitler therefore led a short-lived coalition government formed with the German National People's Party. Under pressure from politicians, industrialists, and the business community, President Paul von Hindenburg appointed Hitler as Chancellor of Germany on 30 January 1933. This event is known as the Machtergreifung ("seizure of power").

On the night of 27 February 1933, the Reichstag building was set afire. Marinus van der Lubbe, a Dutch communist, was found guilty of starting the blaze. Hitler proclaimed that the arson marked the start of a communist uprising. The Reichstag Fire Decree, imposed on 28 February 1933, rescinded most civil liberties, including rights of assembly and freedom of the press. The decree also allowed the police to detain people indefinitely without charges. The legislation was accompanied by a propaganda campaign that led to public support for the measure. Violent suppression of communists by the SA was undertaken nationwide and 4,000 members of the Communist Party of Germany were arrested.

On 23 March 1933, the Enabling Act, an amendment to the Weimar Constitution, passed in the Reichstag by a vote of 444 to 94. This amendment allowed Hitler and his cabinet to pass laws—even laws that violated the constitution—without the consent of the president or the Reichstag. As the bill required a two-thirds majority to pass, the Nazis used intimidation tactics as well as the provisions of the Reichstag Fire Decree to keep several Social Democratic deputies from attending, and the Communists had already been banned. On 10 May, the government seized the assets of the Social Democrats, and they were banned on 22 June. On 21 June, the SA raided the offices of the German National People's Party – their former coalition partners – which then disbanded on 29 June. The remaining major political parties followed suit. On 14 July 1933 Germany became a one-party state with the passage of a law decreeing the Nazi Party to be the sole legal party in Germany. The founding of new parties was also made illegal, and all remaining political parties which had not already been dissolved were banned. The Enabling Act would subsequently serve as the legal foundation for the dictatorship the Nazis established. Further elections in November 1933, 1936, and 1938 were Nazi-controlled, with only members of the Party and a small number of independents elected.

Nazification of Germany 

The Hitler cabinet used the terms of the Reichstag Fire Decree and later the Enabling Act to initiate the process of Gleichschaltung ("co-ordination"), which brought all aspects of life under party control. Individual states not controlled by elected Nazi governments or Nazi-led coalitions were forced to agree to the appointment of Reich Commissars to bring the states in line with the policies of the central government. These Commissars had the power to appoint and remove local governments, state parliaments, officials, and judges. In this way Germany became a de facto unitary state, with all state governments controlled by the central government under the Nazis. The state parliaments and the Reichsrat (federal upper house) were abolished in January 1934, with all state powers being transferred to the central government.

All civilian organisations, including agricultural groups, volunteer organisations, and sports clubs, had their leadership replaced with Nazi sympathisers or party members; these civic organisations either merged with the Nazi Party or faced dissolution. The Nazi government declared a "Day of National Labor" for May Day 1933, and invited many trade union delegates to Berlin for celebrations. The day after, SA stormtroopers demolished union offices around the country; all trade unions were forced to dissolve and their leaders were arrested. The Law for the Restoration of the Professional Civil Service, passed in April, removed from their jobs all teachers, professors, judges, magistrates, and government officials who were Jewish or whose commitment to the party was suspect. This meant the only non-political institutions not under control of the Nazis were the churches.

The Nazi regime abolished the symbols of the Weimar Republic—including the black, red, and gold tricolour flag—and adopted reworked symbolism. The previous imperial black, white, and red tricolour was restored as one of Germany's two official flags; the second was the swastika flag of the Nazi Party, which became the sole national flag in 1935. The Party anthem "Horst-Wessel-Lied" ("Horst Wessel Song") became a second national anthem.

Germany was still in a dire economic situation, as six million people were unemployed and the balance of trade deficit was daunting. Using deficit spending, public works projects were undertaken beginning in 1934, creating 1.7 million new jobs by the end of that year alone. Average wages began to rise.

Consolidation of power 
The SA leadership continued to apply pressure for greater political and military power. In response, Hitler used the Schutzstaffel (SS) and Gestapo to purge the entire SA leadership. Hitler targeted SA Stabschef (Chief of Staff) Ernst Röhm and other SA leaders who—along with a number of Hitler's political adversaries (such as Gregor Strasser and former chancellor Kurt von Schleicher)—were arrested and shot. Up to 200 people were killed from 30 June to 2 July 1934 in an event that became known as the Night of the Long Knives.

On 2 August 1934, Hindenburg died. The previous day, the cabinet had enacted the "Law Concerning the Highest State Office of the Reich", which stated that upon Hindenburg's death the office of president would be abolished and its powers merged with those of the chancellor. Hitler thus became head of state as well as head of government and was formally named as Führer und Reichskanzler ("Leader and Chancellor"), although eventually Reichskanzler was dropped. Germany was now a totalitarian state with Hitler at its head. As head of state, Hitler became Supreme Commander of the armed forces. The new law provided an altered loyalty oath for servicemen so that they affirmed loyalty to Hitler personally rather than the office of supreme commander or the state. On 19 August, the merger of the presidency with the chancellorship was approved by 90 per cent of the electorate in a plebiscite.

Most Germans were relieved that the conflicts and street fighting of the Weimar era had ended. They were deluged with propaganda orchestrated by Minister of Public Enlightenment and Propaganda Joseph Goebbels, who promised peace and plenty for all in a united, Marxist-free country without the constraints of the Versailles Treaty. The Nazi Party obtained and legitimised power through its initial revolutionary activities, then through manipulation of legal mechanisms, the use of police powers, and by taking control of the state and federal institutions. The first major Nazi concentration camp, initially for political prisoners, was opened at Dachau in 1933. Hundreds of camps of varying size and function were created by the end of the war.

Beginning in April 1933, scores of measures defining the status of Jews and their rights were instituted. These measures culminated in the establishment of the Nuremberg Laws of 1935, which stripped them of their basic rights. The Nazis would take from the Jews their wealth, their right to intermarry with non-Jews, and their right to occupy many fields of labour (such as law, medicine, or education). Eventually the Nazis declared the Jews as undesirable to remain among German citizens and society.

Military build-up 

In the early years of the regime, Germany was without allies, and its military was drastically weakened by the Versailles Treaty. France, Poland, Italy, and the Soviet Union each had reasons to object to Hitler's rise to power. Poland suggested to France that the two nations engage in a preventive war against Germany in March 1933. Fascist Italy objected to German claims in the Balkans and on Austria, which Benito Mussolini considered to be in Italy's sphere of influence.

As early as February 1933, Hitler announced that rearmament must begin, albeit clandestinely at first, as to do so was in violation of the Versailles Treaty. On 17 May 1933, Hitler gave a speech before the Reichstag outlining his desire for world peace and accepted an offer from American President Franklin D. Roosevelt for military disarmament, provided the other nations of Europe did the same. When the other European powers failed to accept this offer, Hitler pulled Germany out of the World Disarmament Conference and the League of Nations in October, claiming its disarmament clauses were unfair if they applied only to Germany. In a referendum held in November, 95 per cent of voters supported Germany's withdrawal.

In 1934, Hitler told his military leaders that a war in the east should begin in 1942. The Saarland, which had been placed under League of Nations supervision for 15 years at the end of World War I, voted in January 1935 to become part of Germany. In March 1935, Hitler announced the creation of an air force, and that the Reichswehr would be increased to 550,000 men. Britain agreed to Germany building a naval fleet with the signing of the Anglo-German Naval Agreement on 18 June 1935.

When the Italian invasion of Ethiopia led to only mild protests by the British and French governments, on 7 March 1936 Hitler used the Franco-Soviet Treaty of Mutual Assistance as a pretext to order the army to march 3,000 troops into the demilitarised zone in the Rhineland in violation of the Versailles Treaty. As the territory was part of Germany, the British and French governments did not feel that attempting to enforce the treaty was worth the risk of war. In the one-party election held on 29 March, the Nazis received 98.9 per cent support. In 1936, Hitler signed an Anti-Comintern Pact with Japan and a non-aggression agreement with Mussolini, who was soon referring to a "Rome-Berlin Axis".

Hitler sent military supplies and assistance to the Nationalist forces of General Francisco Franco in the Spanish Civil War, which began in July 1936. The German Condor Legion included a range of aircraft and their crews, as well as a tank contingent. The aircraft of the Legion destroyed the city of Guernica in 1937. The Nationalists were victorious in 1939 and became an informal ally of Nazi Germany.

Austria and Czechoslovakia 

In February 1938, Hitler emphasised to Austrian Chancellor Kurt Schuschnigg the need for Germany to secure its frontiers. Schuschnigg scheduled a plebiscite regarding Austrian independence for 13 March, but Hitler sent an ultimatum to Schuschnigg on 11 March demanding that he hand over all power to the Austrian Nazi Party or face an invasion. German troops entered Austria the next day, to be greeted with enthusiasm by the populace.

The Republic of Czechoslovakia was home to a substantial minority of Germans, who lived mostly in the Sudetenland. Under pressure from separatist groups within the Sudeten German Party, the Czechoslovak government offered economic concessions to the region. Hitler decided not just to incorporate the Sudetenland into the Reich, but to destroy the country of Czechoslovakia entirely. The Nazis undertook a propaganda campaign to try to generate support for an invasion. Top German military leaders opposed the plan, as Germany was not yet ready for war.

The crisis led to war preparations by Britain, Czechoslovakia, and France (Czechoslovakia's ally). Attempting to avoid war, British Prime Minister Neville Chamberlain arranged a series of meetings, the result of which was the Munich Agreement, signed on 29 September 1938. The Czechoslovak government was forced to accept the Sudetenland's annexation into Germany. Chamberlain was greeted with cheers when he landed in London, saying the agreement brought "peace for our time". In addition to the German annexation, Poland seized a narrow strip of land near Cieszyn on 2 October, while as a consequence of the Munich Agreement, Hungary demanded and received  along their northern border in the First Vienna Award on 2 November. Following negotiations with President Emil Hácha, Hitler seized the rest of the Czech half of the country on 15 March 1939 and created the Protectorate of Bohemia and Moravia, one day after the proclamation of the Slovak Republic in the Slovak half. Also on 15 March, Hungary occupied and annexed the recently proclaimed and unrecognised Carpatho-Ukraine and an additional sliver of land disputed with Slovakia.

Austrian and Czech foreign exchange reserves were seized by the Nazis, as were stockpiles of raw materials such as metals and completed goods such as weaponry and aircraft, which were shipped to Germany. The Reichswerke Hermann Göring industrial conglomerate took control of steel and coal production facilities in both countries.

Poland 

In January 1934, Germany signed a non-aggression pact with Poland. In March 1939, Hitler demanded the return of the Free City of Danzig and the Polish Corridor, a strip of land that separated East Prussia from the rest of Germany. The British announced they would come to the aid of Poland if it was attacked. Hitler, believing the British would not actually take action, ordered an invasion plan should be readied for September 1939. On 23 May, Hitler described to his generals his overall plan of not only seizing the Polish Corridor but greatly expanding German territory eastward at the expense of Poland. He expected this time they would be met by force.

The Germans reaffirmed their alliance with Italy and signed non-aggression pacts with Denmark, Estonia, and Latvia whilst trade links were formalised with Romania, Norway, and Sweden. Foreign Minister Joachim von Ribbentrop arranged in negotiations with the Soviet Union a non-aggression pact, the Molotov–Ribbentrop Pact, signed in August 1939. The treaty also contained secret protocols dividing Poland and the Baltic states into German and Soviet spheres of influence.

World War II

Foreign policy 

Germany's wartime foreign policy involved the creation of allied governments controlled directly or indirectly from Berlin. They intended to obtain soldiers from allies such as Italy and Hungary and workers and food supplies from allies such as Vichy France. Hungary was the fourth nation to join the Axis, signing the Tripartite Pact on 27 September 1940. Bulgaria signed the pact on 17 November. German efforts to secure oil included negotiating a supply from their new ally, Romania, who signed the Pact on 23 November, alongside the Slovak Republic. By late 1942, there were 24 divisions from Romania on the Eastern Front, 10 from Italy, and 10 from Hungary. Germany assumed full control in France in 1942, Italy in 1943, and Hungary in 1944. Although Japan was a powerful ally, the relationship was distant, with little co-ordination or co-operation. For example, Germany refused to share their formula for synthetic oil from coal until late in the war.

Outbreak of war 
Germany invaded Poland and captured the Free City of Danzig on 1 September 1939, beginning World War II in Europe. Honouring their treaty obligations, Britain and France declared war on Germany two days later. Poland fell quickly, as the Soviet Union attacked from the east on 17 September. Reinhard Heydrich, chief of the Sicherheitspolizei (SiPo; Security Police) and Sicherheitsdienst (SD; Security Service), ordered on 21 September that Polish Jews should be rounded up and concentrated into cities with good rail links. Initially the intention was to deport them further east, or possibly to Madagascar. Using lists prepared in advance, some 65,000 Polish intelligentsia, noblemen, clergy, and teachers were murdered by the end of 1939 in an attempt to destroy Poland's identity as a nation. Soviet forces advanced into Finland in the Winter War, and German forces saw action at sea. But little other activity occurred until May, so the period became known as the "Phoney War".

From the start of the war, a British blockade on shipments to Germany affected its economy. Germany was particularly dependent on foreign supplies of oil, coal, and grain. Thanks to trade embargoes and the blockade, imports into Germany declined by 80 per cent. To safeguard Swedish iron ore shipments to Germany, Hitler ordered the invasion of Denmark and Norway, which began on 9 April. Denmark fell after less than a day, while most of Norway followed by the end of the month. By early June, Germany occupied all of Norway.

Conquest of Europe 
Against the advice of many of his senior military officers, in May 1940 Hitler ordered an attack on France and the Low Countries. They quickly conquered Luxembourg and the Netherlands and outmanoeuvred the Allies in Belgium, forcing the evacuation of many British and French troops at Dunkirk. France fell as well, surrendering to Germany on 22 June. The victory in France resulted in an upswing in Hitler's popularity and an upsurge in war fever in Germany.

In violation of the provisions of the Hague Convention, industrial firms in the Netherlands, France, and Belgium were put to work producing war materiel for Germany.

The Nazis seized from the French thousands of locomotives and rolling stock, stockpiles of weapons, and raw materials such as copper, tin, oil, and nickel. Payments for occupation costs were levied upon France, Belgium, and Norway. Barriers to trade led to hoarding, black markets, and uncertainty about the future. Food supplies were precarious; production dropped in most of Europe. Famine was experienced in many occupied countries.

Hitler's peace overtures to the new British Prime Minister Winston Churchill were rejected in July 1940. Grand Admiral Erich Raeder had advised Hitler in June that air superiority was a pre-condition for a successful invasion of Britain, so Hitler ordered a series of aerial attacks on Royal Air Force (RAF) airbases and radar stations, as well as nightly air raids on British cities, including London, Plymouth, and Coventry. The German Luftwaffe failed to defeat the RAF in what became known as the Battle of Britain, and by the end of October, Hitler realised that air superiority would not be achieved. He permanently postponed the invasion, a plan which the commanders of the German army had never taken entirely seriously. Several historians, including Andrew Gordon, believe the primary reason for the failure of the invasion plan was the superiority of the Royal Navy, not the actions of the RAF.

In February 1941, the German Afrika Korps arrived in Libya to aid the Italians in the North African Campaign. On 6 April, Germany launched an invasion of Yugoslavia and Greece. All of Yugoslavia and parts of Greece were subsequently divided between Germany, Hungary, Italy, and Bulgaria.

Invasion of the Soviet Union 

On 22 June 1941, contravening the Molotov–Ribbentrop Pact, about 3.8 million Axis troops attacked the Soviet Union. In addition to Hitler's stated purpose of acquiring Lebensraum, this large-scale offensive—codenamed Operation Barbarossa—was intended to destroy the Soviet Union and seize its natural resources for subsequent aggression against the Western powers. The reaction among Germans was one of surprise and trepidation as many were concerned about how much longer the war would continue or suspected that Germany could not win a war fought on two fronts.

The invasion conquered a huge area, including the Baltic states, Belarus, and west Ukraine. After the successful Battle of Smolensk in September 1941, Hitler ordered Army Group Centre to halt its advance to Moscow and temporarily divert its Panzer groups to aid in the encirclement of Leningrad and Kyiv. This pause provided the Red Army with an opportunity to mobilise fresh reserves. The Moscow offensive, which resumed in October 1941, ended disastrously in December. On 7 December 1941, Japan attacked Pearl Harbor, Hawaii. Four days later, Germany declared war on the United States.

Food was in short supply in the conquered areas of the Soviet Union and Poland, as the retreating armies had burned the crops in some areas, and much of the remainder was sent back to the Reich. In Germany, rations were cut in 1942. In his role as Plenipotentiary of the Four Year Plan, Hermann Göring demanded increased shipments of grain from France and fish from Norway. The 1942 harvest was good, and food supplies remained adequate in Western Europe.

Germany and Europe as a whole were almost totally dependent on foreign oil imports. In an attempt to resolve the shortage, in June 1942 Germany launched Fall Blau ("Case Blue"), an offensive against the Caucasian oilfields. The Red Army launched a counter-offensive on 19 November and encircled the Axis forces, who were trapped in Stalingrad on 23 November. Göring assured Hitler that the 6th Army could be supplied by air, but this turned out to be infeasible. Hitler's refusal to allow a retreat led to the deaths of 200,000 German and Romanian soldiers; of the 91,000 men who surrendered in the city on 31 January 1943, only 6,000 survivors returned to Germany after the war.

Turning point and collapse 

Losses continued to mount after Stalingrad, leading to a sharp reduction in the popularity of the Nazi Party and deteriorating morale. Soviet forces continued to push westward after the failed German offensive at the Battle of Kursk in the summer of 1943. By the end of 1943, the Germans had lost most of their eastern territorial gains. In Egypt, Field Marshal Erwin Rommel's Afrika Korps were defeated by British forces under Field Marshal Bernard Montgomery in October 1942. The Allies landed in Sicily in July 1943 and in Italy in September. Meanwhile, American and British bomber fleets based in Britain began operations against Germany. Many sorties were intentionally given civilian targets in an effort to destroy German morale. The bombing of aircraft factories as well as Peenemünde Army Research Center, where V-1 and V-2 rockets were being developed and produced, were also deemed particularly important. German aircraft production could not keep pace with losses, and without air cover the Allied bombing campaign became even more devastating. By targeting oil refineries and factories, they crippled the German war effort by late 1944.

On 6 June 1944, American, British, and Canadian forces established a front in France with the D-Day landings in Normandy. On 20 July 1944, Hitler survived an assassination attempt. He ordered brutal reprisals, resulting in 7,000 arrests and the execution of more than 4,900 people. The failed Ardennes Offensive (16 December 1944 – 25 January 1945) was the last major German offensive on the western front, and Soviet forces entered Germany on 27 January. Hitler's refusal to admit defeat and his insistence that the war be fought to the last man led to unnecessary death and destruction in the war's closing months. Through his Justice Minister Otto Georg Thierack, Hitler ordered that anyone who was not prepared to fight should be court-martialed, and thousands of people were executed. In many areas, people surrendered to the approaching Allies in spite of exhortations of local leaders to continue to fight. Hitler ordered the destruction of transport, bridges, industries, and other infrastructure—a scorched earth decree—but Armaments Minister Albert Speer prevented this order from being fully carried out.

During the Battle of Berlin (16 April 1945 – 2 May 1945), Hitler and his staff lived in the underground Führerbunker while the Red Army approached. On 30 April, when Soviet troops were within two blocks of the Reich Chancellery, Hitler, along with his girlfriend and by then wife Eva Braun committed suicide. On 2 May, General Helmuth Weidling unconditionally surrendered Berlin to Soviet General Vasily Chuikov. Hitler was succeeded by Grand Admiral Karl Dönitz as Reich President and Goebbels as Reich Chancellor. Goebbels and his wife Magda committed suicide the next day after murdering their six children. Between 4 and 8 May 1945, most of the remaining German armed forces unconditionally surrendered. The German Instrument of Surrender was signed 8 May, marking the end of the Nazi regime and the end of World War II in Europe.

Popular support for Hitler almost completely disappeared as the war drew to a close. Suicide rates in Germany increased, particularly in areas where the Red Army was advancing. Among soldiers and party personnel, suicide was often deemed an honourable and heroic alternative to surrender. First-hand accounts and propaganda about the uncivilised behaviour of the advancing Soviet troops caused panic among civilians on the Eastern Front, especially women, who feared being raped. More than a thousand people (out of a population of around 16,000) committed suicide in Demmin on and around 1 May 1945 as the 65th Army of 2nd Belorussian Front first broke into a distillery and then rampaged through the town, committing mass rapes, arbitrarily executing civilians, and setting fire to buildings. High numbers of suicides took place in many other locations, including Neubrandenburg (600 dead), Stolp in Pommern (1,000 dead), and Berlin, where at least 7,057 people committed suicide in 1945.

German casualties 

Estimates of the total German war dead range from 5.5 to 6.9 million persons. A study by German historian Rüdiger Overmans puts the number of German military dead and missing at 5.3 million, including 900,000 men conscripted from outside of Germany's 1937 borders. Richard Overy estimated in 2014 that about 353,000 civilians were killed in Allied air raids. Other civilian deaths include 300,000 Germans (including Jews) who were victims of Nazi political, racial, and religious persecution and 200,000 who were murdered in the Nazi euthanasia program. Political courts called Sondergerichte sentenced some 12,000 members of the German resistance to death, and civil courts sentenced an additional 40,000 Germans. Mass rapes of German women also took place.

Geography

Territorial changes 

As a result of their defeat in World War I and the resulting Treaty of Versailles, Germany lost Alsace-Lorraine, Northern Schleswig, and Memel. The Saarland became a protectorate of France under the condition that its residents would later decide by referendum which country to join, and Poland became a separate nation and was given access to the sea by the creation of the Polish Corridor, which separated Prussia from the rest of Germany, while Danzig was made a free city.

Germany regained control of the Saarland through a referendum held in 1935 and annexed Austria in the Anschluss of 1938. The Munich Agreement of 1938 gave Germany control of the Sudetenland, and they seized the remainder of Czechoslovakia six months later. Under threat of invasion by sea, Lithuania surrendered the Memel district in March 1939.

Between 1939 and 1941, German forces invaded Poland, Denmark, Norway, France, Luxembourg, the Netherlands, Belgium, Yugoslavia, Greece, and the Soviet Union. Germany annexed parts of northern Yugoslavia in April 1941, while Mussolini ceded Trieste, South Tyrol, and Istria to Germany in 1943.

Occupied territories 

Some of the conquered territories were incorporated into Germany as part of Hitler's long-term goal of creating a Greater Germanic Reich. Several areas, such as Alsace-Lorraine, were placed under the authority of an adjacent Gau (regional district). The Reichskommissariate (Reich Commissariats), quasi-colonial regimes, were established in some occupied countries. Areas placed under German administration included the Protectorate of Bohemia and Moravia, Reichskommissariat Ostland (encompassing the Baltic states and Belarus), and Reichskommissariat Ukraine. Conquered areas of Belgium and France were placed under control of the Military Administration in Belgium and Northern France. Belgian Eupen-Malmedy, which had been part of Germany until 1919, was annexed. Part of Poland was incorporated into the Reich, and the General Government was established in occupied central Poland. The governments of Denmark, Norway (Reichskommissariat Norwegen), and the Netherlands (Reichskommissariat Niederlande) were placed under civilian administrations staffed largely by natives. Hitler intended to eventually incorporate many of these areas into the Reich. Germany occupied the Italian protectorate of Albania and the Italian governorate of Montenegro in 1943 and installed a puppet government in occupied Serbia in 1941.

Politics

Ideology 

The Nazis were a far-right fascist political party which arose during the social and financial upheavals that occurred following the end of World War I. The Party remained small and marginalised, receiving 2.6% of the federal vote in 1928, prior to the onset of the Great Depression in 1929. By 1930 the Party won 18.3% of the federal vote, making it the Reichstag's second largest political party. While in prison after the failed Beer Hall Putsch of 1923, Hitler wrote Mein Kampf, which laid out his plan for transforming German society into one based on race. Nazi ideology brought together elements of antisemitism, racial hygiene, and eugenics, and combined them with pan-Germanism and territorial expansionism with the goal of obtaining more Lebensraum for the Germanic people. The regime attempted to obtain this new territory by attacking Poland and the Soviet Union, intending to deport or murder the Jews and Slavs living there, who were viewed as being inferior to the Aryan master race and part of a Jewish-Bolshevik conspiracy. The Nazi regime believed that only Germany could defeat the forces of Bolshevism and save humanity from world domination by International Jewry. Other people deemed life unworthy of life by the Nazis included the mentally and physically disabled, Romani people, homosexuals, Jehovah's Witnesses, and social misfits. Additionally, Freemasons were heavily monitored and persecuted.

Influenced by the Völkisch movement, the regime was against cultural modernism and supported the development of an extensive military at the expense of intellectualism. Creativity and art were stifled, except where they could serve as propaganda media. The party used symbols such as the Blood Flag and rituals such as the Nazi Party rallies to foster unity and bolster the regime's popularity.

Government 

Hitler ruled Germany autocratically by asserting the Führerprinzip ("leader principle"), which called for absolute obedience by all subordinates. He viewed the government structure as a pyramid, with himself—the infallible leader—at the apex. Party rank was not determined by elections, and positions were filled through appointment by those of higher rank. The party used propaganda to develop a cult of personality around Hitler. Historians such as Kershaw emphasise the psychological impact of Hitler's skill as an orator. Roger Gill states: "His moving speeches captured the minds and hearts of a vast number of the German people: he virtually hypnotized his audiences".

While top officials reported to Hitler and followed his policies, they had considerable autonomy. He expected officials to "work towards the Führer" – to take the initiative in promoting policies and actions in line with party goals and Hitler's wishes, without his involvement in day-to-day decision-making. The government was a disorganised collection of factions led by the party elite, who struggled to amass power and gain the Führer's favour. Hitler's leadership style was to give contradictory orders to his subordinates and to place them in positions where their duties and responsibilities overlapped. In this way he fostered distrust, competition, and infighting among his subordinates to consolidate and maximise his own power.

Successive Reichsstatthalter decrees between 1933 and 1935 abolished the existing Länder (constituent states) of Germany and replaced them with new administrative divisions, the Gaue, governed by Nazi leaders (Gauleiters). The change was never fully implemented, as the Länder were still used as administrative divisions for some government departments such as education. This led to a bureaucratic tangle of overlapping jurisdictions and responsibilities typical of the administrative style of the Nazi regime.

Jewish civil servants lost their jobs in 1933, except for those who had seen military service in World War I. Members of the Party or party supporters were appointed in their place. As part of the process of Gleichschaltung, the Reich Local Government Law of 1935 abolished local elections, and mayors were appointed by the Ministry of the Interior.

Law 

In August 1934, civil servants and members of the military were required to swear an oath of unconditional obedience to Hitler. These laws became the basis of the Führerprinzip, the concept that Hitler's word overrode all existing laws. Any acts that were sanctioned by Hitler—even murder—thus became legal. All legislation proposed by cabinet ministers had to be approved by the office of Deputy Führer Rudolf Hess, who could also veto top civil service appointments.

Most of the judicial system and legal codes of the Weimar Republic remained in place to deal with non-political crimes. The courts issued and carried out far more death sentences than before the Nazis took power. People who were convicted of three or more offences—even petty ones—could be deemed habitual offenders and jailed indefinitely. People such as prostitutes and pickpockets were judged to be inherently criminal and a threat to the community. Thousands were arrested and confined indefinitely without trial.

A new type of court, the Volksgerichtshof ("People's Court"), was established in 1934 to deal with political cases. This court handed out over 5,000 death sentences until its dissolution in 1945. The death penalty could be issued for offences such as being a communist, printing seditious leaflets, or even making jokes about Hitler or other officials. The Gestapo was in charge of investigative policing to enforce Nazi ideology as they located and confined political offenders, Jews, and others deemed undesirable. Political offenders who were released from prison were often immediately re-arrested by the Gestapo and confined in a concentration camp.

The Nazis used propaganda to promulgate the concept of Rassenschande ("race defilement") to justify the need for racial laws. In September 1935, the Nuremberg Laws were enacted. These laws initially prohibited sexual relations and marriages between Aryans and Jews and were later extended to include "Gypsies, Negroes or their bastard offspring". The law also forbade the employment of German women under the age of 45 as domestic servants in Jewish households. The Reich Citizenship Law stated that only those of "German or related blood" could be citizens. Thus Jews and other non-Aryans were stripped of their German citizenship. The law also permitted the Nazis to deny citizenship to anyone who was not supportive enough of the regime. A supplementary decree issued in November defined as Jewish anyone with three Jewish grandparents, or two grandparents if the Jewish faith was followed.

Military and paramilitary

Wehrmacht 

The unified armed forces of Germany from 1935 to 1945 were called the Wehrmacht (defence force). This included the Heer (army), Kriegsmarine (navy), and the Luftwaffe (air force). From 2 August 1934, members of the armed forces were required to pledge an oath of unconditional obedience to Hitler personally. In contrast to the previous oath, which required allegiance to the constitution of the country and its lawful establishments, this new oath required members of the military to obey Hitler even if they were being ordered to do something illegal. Hitler decreed that the army would have to tolerate and even offer logistical support to the Einsatzgruppen—the mobile death squads responsible for millions of murders in Eastern Europe—when it was tactically possible to do so. Wehrmacht troops also participated directly in the Holocaust by shooting civilians or committing genocide under the guise of anti-partisan operations. The party line was that the Jews were the instigators of the partisan struggle and therefore needed to be eliminated. On 8 July 1941, Heydrich announced that all Jews in the eastern conquered territories were to be regarded as partisans and gave the order for all male Jews between the ages of 15 and 45 to be shot. By August, this was extended to include the entire Jewish population.

In spite of efforts to prepare the country militarily, the economy could not sustain a lengthy war of attrition. A strategy was developed based on the tactic of Blitzkrieg ("lightning war"), which involved using quick coordinated assaults that avoided enemy strong points. Attacks began with artillery bombardment, followed by bombing and strafing runs. Next the tanks would attack and finally the infantry would move in to secure the captured area. Victories continued through mid-1940, but the failure to defeat Britain was the first major turning point in the war. The decision to attack the Soviet Union and the decisive defeat at Stalingrad led to the retreat of the German armies and the eventual loss of the war. The total number of soldiers who served in the Wehrmacht from 1935 to 1945 was around 18.2 million, of whom 5.3 million died.

The SA and SS 

The Sturmabteilung (SA; Storm Detachment), or Brownshirts, founded in 1921, was the first paramilitary wing of the Nazi Party; their initial assignment was to protect Nazi leaders at rallies and assemblies. They also took part in street battles against the forces of rival political parties and violent actions against Jews and others. Under Ernst Röhm's leadership the SA grew by 1934 to over half a million members—4.5 million including reserves—at a time when the regular army was still limited to 100,000 men by the Versailles Treaty.

Röhm hoped to assume command of the army and absorb it into the ranks of the SA. Hindenburg and Defence Minister Werner von Blomberg threatened to impose martial law if the activities of the SA were not curtailed. Therefore, less than a year and a half after seizing power, Hitler ordered the deaths of the SA leadership, including Rohm. After the purge of 1934, the SA was no longer a major force.

Initially a small bodyguard unit under the auspices of the SA, the Schutzstaffel (SS; Protection Squadron) grew to become one of the largest and most powerful groups in Nazi Germany. Led by Reichsführer-SS Heinrich Himmler from 1929, the SS had over a quarter million members by 1938. Himmler initially envisioned the SS as being an elite group of guards, Hitler's last line of defence. The Waffen-SS, the military branch of the SS, evolved into a second army. It was dependent on the regular army for heavy weaponry and equipment, and most units were under tactical control of the High Command of the Armed Forces (OKW). By the end of 1942, the stringent selection and racial requirements that had initially been in place were no longer followed. With recruitment and conscription based only on expansion, by 1943 the Waffen-SS could not longer claim to be an elite fighting force.

SS formations committed many war crimes against civilians and allied servicemen. From 1935 onward, the SS spearheaded the persecution of Jews, who were rounded up into ghettos and concentration camps. With the outbreak of World War II, the SS Einsatzgruppen units followed the army into Poland and the Soviet Union, where from 1941 to 1945 they murdered more than two million people, including 1.3 million Jews. A third of the Einsatzgruppen members were recruited from Waffen-SS personnel. The SS-Totenkopfverbände (death's head units) ran the concentration camps and extermination camps, where millions more were murdered. Up to 60,000 Waffen-SS men served in the camps.

In 1931, Himmler organised an SS intelligence service which became known as the Sicherheitsdienst (SD; Security Service) under his deputy, Heydrich. This organisation was tasked with locating and arresting communists and other political opponents. Himmler established the beginnings of a parallel economy under the auspices of the SS Economy and Administration Head Office. This holding company owned housing corporations, factories, and publishing houses.

Economy

Reich economics 

The most pressing economic matter the Nazis initially faced was the 30 per cent national unemployment rate. Economist Dr. Hjalmar Schacht, President of the Reichsbank and Minister of Economics, created a scheme for deficit financing in May 1933. Capital projects were paid for with the issuance of promissory notes called Mefo bills. When the notes were presented for payment, the Reichsbank printed money. Hitler and his economic team expected that the upcoming territorial expansion would provide the means of repaying the soaring national debt. Schacht's administration achieved a rapid decline in the unemployment rate, the largest of any country during the Great Depression. Economic recovery was uneven, with reduced hours of work and erratic availability of necessities, leading to disenchantment with the regime as early as 1934.

In October 1933, the Junkers Aircraft Works was expropriated. In concert with other aircraft manufacturers and under the direction of Aviation Minister Göring, production was ramped up. From a workforce of 3,200 people producing 100 units per year in 1932, the industry grew to employ a quarter of a million workers manufacturing over 10,000 technically advanced aircraft annually less than ten years later.

An elaborate bureaucracy was created to regulate imports of raw materials and finished goods with the intention of eliminating foreign competition in the German marketplace and improving the nation's balance of payments. The Nazis encouraged the development of synthetic replacements for materials such as oil and textiles. As the market was experiencing a glut and prices for petroleum were low, in 1933 the Nazi government made a profit-sharing agreement with IG Farben, guaranteeing them a 5 per cent return on capital invested in their synthetic oil plant at Leuna. Any profits in excess of that amount would be turned over to the Reich. By 1936, Farben regretted making the deal, as excess profits were by then being generated. In another attempt to secure an adequate wartime supply of petroleum, Germany intimidated Romania into signing a trade agreement in March 1939.

Major public works projects financed with deficit spending included the construction of a network of Autobahnen and providing funding for programmes initiated by the previous government for housing and agricultural improvements. To stimulate the construction industry, credit was offered to private businesses and subsidies were made available for home purchases and repairs. On the condition that the wife would leave the workforce, a loan of up to 1,000 Reichsmarks could be accessed by young couples of Aryan descent who intended to marry, and the amount that had to be repaid was reduced by 25 per cent for each child born. The caveat that the woman had to remain unemployed outside the home was dropped by 1937 due to a shortage of skilled labourers.

Envisioning widespread car ownership as part of the new Germany, Hitler arranged for designer Ferdinand Porsche to draw up plans for the KdF-wagen (Strength Through Joy car), intended to be an automobile that everyone could afford. A prototype was displayed at the International Motor Show in Berlin on 17 February 1939. With the outbreak of World War II, the factory was converted to produce military vehicles. None were sold until after the war, when the vehicle was renamed the Volkswagen (people's car).

Six million people were unemployed when the Nazis took power in 1933 and by 1937 there were fewer than a million. This was in part due to the removal of women from the workforce. Real wages dropped by 25 per cent between 1933 and 1938. After the dissolution of the trade unions in May 1933, their funds were seized and their leadership arrested, including those who attempted to co-operate with the Nazis. A new organisation, the German Labour Front, was created and placed under Nazi Party functionary Robert Ley. The average work week was 43 hours in 1933; by 1939 this increased to 47 hours.

By early 1934, the focus shifted towards rearmament. By 1935, military expenditures accounted for 73 per cent of the government's purchases of goods and services. On 18 October 1936, Hitler named Göring as Plenipotentiary of the Four Year Plan, intended to speed up rearmament. In addition to calling for the rapid construction of steel mills, synthetic rubber plants, and other factories, Göring instituted wage and price controls and restricted the issuance of stock dividends. Large expenditures were made on rearmament in spite of growing deficits. Plans unveiled in late 1938 for massive increases to the navy and air force were impossible to fulfil, as Germany lacked the finances and material resources to build the planned units, as well as the necessary fuel required to keep them running. With the introduction of compulsory military service in 1935, the Reichswehr, which had been limited to 100,000 by the terms of the Versailles Treaty, expanded to 750,000 on active service at the start of World War II, with a million more in the reserve. By January 1939, unemployment was down to 301,800 and it dropped to only 77,500 by September.

Wartime economy and forced labour 

The Nazi war economy was a mixed economy that combined a free market with central planning. Historian Richard Overy describes it as being somewhere in between the command economy of the Soviet Union and the capitalist system of the United States.

In 1942, after the death of Armaments Minister Fritz Todt, Hitler appointed Albert Speer as his replacement. Wartime rationing of consumer goods led to an increase in personal savings, funds which were in turn lent to the government to support the war effort. By 1944, the war was consuming 75 per cent of Germany's gross domestic product, compared to 60 per cent in the Soviet Union and 55 per cent in Britain. Speer improved production by centralising planning and control, reducing production of consumer goods, and using forced labour and slavery. The wartime economy eventually relied heavily upon the large-scale employment of slave labour. Germany imported and enslaved some 12 million people from 20 European countries to work in factories and on farms. Approximately 75 per cent were Eastern European. Many were casualties of Allied bombing, as they received poor air raid protection. Poor living conditions led to high rates of sickness, injury, and death, as well as sabotage and criminal activity. The wartime economy also relied upon large-scale robbery, initially through the state seizing the property of Jewish citizens and later by plundering the resources of occupied territories.

Foreign workers brought into Germany were put into four classifications: guest workers, military internees, civilian workers, and Eastern workers. Each group was subject to different regulations. The Nazis issued a ban on sexual relations between Germans and foreign workers.

By 1944, over a half million women served as auxiliaries in the German armed forces. The number of women in paid employment only increased by 271,000 (1.8 per cent) from 1939 to 1944. As the production of consumer goods had been cut back, women left those industries for employment in the war economy. They also took jobs formerly held by men, especially on farms and in family-owned shops.

Very heavy strategic bombing by the Allies targeted refineries producing synthetic oil and gasoline, as well as the German transportation system, especially rail yards and canals. The armaments industry began to break down by September 1944. By November, fuel coal was no longer reaching its destinations and the production of new armaments was no longer possible. Overy argues that the bombing strained the German war economy and forced it to divert up to one-fourth of its manpower and industry into anti-aircraft resources, which very likely shortened the war.

Financial exploitation of conquered territories 

During the course of the war, the Nazis extracted considerable plunder from occupied Europe. Historian and war correspondent William L. Shirer writes: "The total amount of [Nazi] loot will never be known; it has proved beyond man's capacity to accurately compute." Gold reserves and other foreign holdings were seized from the national banks of occupied nations, while large "occupation costs" were usually imposed. By the end of the war, occupation costs were calculated by the Nazis at 60 billion Reichsmarks, with France alone paying 31.5 billion. The Bank of France was forced to provide 4.5 billion Reichsmarks in "credits" to Germany, while a further 500,000 Reichsmarks were assessed against Vichy France by the Nazis in the form of "fees" and other miscellaneous charges. The Nazis exploited other conquered nations in a similar way. After the war, the United States Strategic Bombing Survey concluded Germany had obtained 104 billion Reichsmarks in the form of occupation costs and other wealth transfers from occupied Europe, including two-thirds of the gross domestic product of Belgium and the Netherlands.

Nazi plunder included private and public art collections, artefacts, precious metals, books, and personal possessions. Hitler and Göring in particular were interested in acquiring looted art treasures from occupied Europe, the former planning to use the stolen art to fill the galleries of the planned Führermuseum (Leader's Museum), and the latter for his personal collection. Göring, having stripped almost all of occupied Poland of its artworks within six months of Germany's invasion, ultimately grew a collection valued at over 50 million Reichsmarks. In 1940, the Reichsleiter Rosenberg Taskforce was established to loot artwork and cultural material from public and private collections, libraries, and museums throughout Europe. France saw the greatest extent of Nazi plunder. Some 26,000 railroad cars of art treasures, furniture, and other looted items were sent to Germany from France. By January 1941, Rosenberg estimated the looted treasures from France to be valued at over one billion Reichsmarks. In addition, soldiers looted or purchased goods such as produce and clothing—items, which were becoming harder to obtain in Germany—for shipment home.

Goods and raw materials were also taken. In France, an estimated  of cereals were seized during the course of the war, including 75 per cent of its oats. In addition, 80 per cent of the country's oil and 74 per cent of its steel production were taken. The valuation of this loot is estimated to be 184.5 billion francs. In Poland, Nazi plunder of raw materials began even before the German invasion had concluded.

Following Operation Barbarossa, the Soviet Union was also plundered. During the course of the German occupation, some 12 million pigs and 13 million sheep were taken. The value of this plunder is estimated at 4 billion Reichsmarks. This relatively low number in comparison to the occupied nations of Western Europe can be attributed to the devastating fighting on the Eastern Front.

Racial policy and eugenics

Racism and antisemitism

Racism and antisemitism were basic tenets of the Nazi Party and the Nazi regime. Nazi Germany's racial policy was based on their belief in the existence of a superior master race. The Nazis postulated the existence of a racial conflict between the Aryan master race and inferior races, particularly Jews, who were viewed as a mixed race that had infiltrated society and were responsible for the exploitation and repression of the Aryan race.

Persecution of Jews 

Discrimination against Jews began immediately after the seizure of power. Following a month-long series of attacks by members of the SA on Jewish businesses and synagogues, on 1 April 1933 Hitler declared a national boycott of Jewish businesses. The Law for the Restoration of the Professional Civil Service passed on 7 April forced all non-Aryan civil servants to retire from the legal profession and civil service. Similar legislation soon deprived other Jewish professionals of their right to practise, and on 11 April a decree was promulgated that stated anyone who had even one Jewish parent or grandparent was considered non-Aryan. As part of the drive to remove Jewish influence from cultural life, members of the National Socialist German Students' League removed from libraries any books considered un-German, and a nationwide book burning was held on 10 May.

The regime used violence and economic pressure to encourage Jews to leave the country voluntarily. Jewish businesses were denied access to markets, forbidden to advertise, and deprived of access to government contracts. Citizens were harassed and subjected to violent attacks. Many towns posted signs forbidding entry to Jews.

On 7 November 1938 a young Jewish man, Herschel Grynszpan, shot and killed Ernst vom Rath, a legation secretary at the German embassy in Paris, to protest his family's treatment in Germany. This incident provided the pretext for a pogrom the Nazis incited against the Jews two days later. Members of the SA damaged or destroyed synagogues and Jewish property throughout Germany. At least 91 German Jews were murdered during this pogrom, later called Kristallnacht, the Night of Broken Glass. Further restrictions were imposed on Jews in the coming months – they were forbidden to own businesses or work in retail shops, drive cars, go to the cinema, visit the library, or own weapons, and Jewish pupils were removed from schools. The Jewish community was fined one billion marks to pay for the damage caused by Kristallnacht and told that any insurance settlements would be confiscated. By 1939, around 250,000 of Germany's 437,000 Jews had emigrated to the United States, Argentina, Great Britain, Palestine, and other countries. Many chose to stay in continental Europe. Emigrants to Palestine were allowed to transfer property there under the terms of the Haavara Agreement, but those moving to other countries had to leave virtually all their property behind, and it was seized by the government.

Persecution of Roma 

Like the Jews, the Romani people were subjected to persecution from the early days of the regime. The Romani were forbidden to marry people of German extraction. They were shipped to concentration camps starting in 1935 and many were murdered. Following the invasion of Poland, 2,500 Roma and Sinti people were deported from Germany to the General Government, where they were imprisoned in labour camps. The survivors were likely exterminated at Bełżec, Sobibor, or Treblinka. A further 5,000 Sinti and Austrian Lalleri people were deported to the Łódź Ghetto in late 1941, where half were estimated to have died. The Romani survivors of the ghetto were subsequently moved to the Chełmno extermination camp in early 1942.

The Nazis intended on deporting all Romani people from Germany, and confined them to Zigeunerlager (Gypsy camps) for this purpose. Himmler ordered their deportation from Germany in December 1942, with few exceptions. A total of 23,000 Romani were deported to Auschwitz concentration camp, of whom 19,000 died. Outside of Germany, the Romani people were regularly used for forced labour, though many were murdered outright. In the Baltic states and the Soviet Union, 30,000 Romani were murdered by the SS, the German Army, and Einsatzgruppen. In occupied Serbia, 1,000 to 12,000 Romani were murdered, while nearly all 25,000 Romani living in the Independent State of Croatia were murdered. The estimates at end of the war put the total number of Romani victims at around 220,000, which equalled approximately 25 per cent of the Romani population in Europe.

Other persecuted groups 

Action T4 was a programme of systematic murder of the physically and mentally handicapped and patients in psychiatric hospitals that took place mainly from 1939 to 1941, and continued until the end of the war. Initially the victims were shot by the Einsatzgruppen and others; gas chambers and gas vans using carbon monoxide were used by early 1940. Under the Law for the Prevention of Hereditarily Diseased Offspring, enacted on 14 July 1933, over 400,000 individuals underwent compulsory sterilisation. Over half were those considered mentally deficient, which included not only people who scored poorly on intelligence tests, but those who deviated from expected standards of behaviour regarding thrift, sexual behaviour, and cleanliness. Most of the victims came from disadvantaged groups such as prostitutes, the poor, the homeless, and criminals. Other groups persecuted and murdered included Jehovah's Witnesses, homosexuals, social misfits, and members of the political and religious opposition.

Generalplan Ost 

Germany's war in the East was based on Hitler's long-standing view that Jews were the great enemy of the German people and that Lebensraum was needed for Germany's expansion. Hitler focused his attention on Eastern Europe, aiming to conquer Poland and the Soviet Union. After the occupation of Poland in 1939, all Jews living in the General Government were confined to ghettos, and those who were physically fit were required to perform compulsory labour. In 1941 Hitler decided to destroy the Polish nation completely; within 15 to 20 years the General Government was to be cleared of ethnic Poles and resettled by German colonists. About 3.8 to 4 million Poles would remain as slaves, part of a slave labour force of 14 million the Nazis intended to create using citizens of conquered nations.

The Generalplan Ost ("General Plan for the East") called for deporting the population of occupied Eastern Europe and the Soviet Union to Siberia, for use as slave labour or to be murdered. To determine who should be killed, Himmler created the Volksliste, a system of classification of people deemed to be of German blood. He ordered that those of Germanic descent who refused to be classified as ethnic Germans should be deported to concentration camps, have their children taken away, or be assigned to forced labour. The plan also included the kidnapping of children deemed to have Aryan-Nordic traits, who were presumed to be of German descent. The goal was to implement Generalplan Ost after the conquest of the Soviet Union, but when the invasion failed Hitler had to consider other options. One suggestion was a mass forced deportation of Jews to Poland, Palestine, or Madagascar.

In addition to eliminating Jews, the Nazis planned to reduce the population of the conquered territories by 30 million people through starvation in an action called the Hunger Plan. Food supplies would be diverted to the German army and German civilians. Cities would be razed and the land allowed to return to forest or resettled by German colonists. Together, the Hunger Plan and Generalplan Ost would have led to the starvation of 80 million people in the Soviet Union. These partially fulfilled plans resulted in the democidal deaths of an estimated 19.3 million civilians and prisoners of war (POWs) throughout the USSR and elsewhere in Europe. During the course of the war, the Soviet Union lost a total of 27 million people; less than nine million of these were combat deaths. One in four of the Soviet population were killed or wounded.

The Holocaust and Final Solution 

Around the time of the failed offensive against Moscow in December 1941, Hitler resolved that the Jews of Europe were to be exterminated immediately. While the murder of Jewish civilians had been ongoing in the occupied territories of Poland and the Soviet Union, plans for the total eradication of the Jewish population of Europe—eleven million people—were formalised at the Wannsee Conference on 20 January 1942. Some would be worked to death and the rest would be murdered in the implementation of the Final Solution to the Jewish Question. Initially the victims were murdered by Einsatzgruppen firing squads, then by stationary gas chambers or by gas vans, but these methods proved impractical for an operation of this scale. By 1942 extermination camps equipped with gas chambers were established at Auschwitz, Chełmno, Sobibor, Treblinka, and elsewhere. The total number of Jews murdered is estimated at 5.5 to six million, including over a million children.

The Allies received information about the murders from the Polish government-in-exile and Polish leadership in Warsaw, based mostly on intelligence from the Polish underground. German citizens had access to information about what was happening, as soldiers returning from the occupied territories reported on what they had seen and done. Historian Richard J. Evans states that most German citizens disapproved of the genocide.

Oppression of ethnic Poles 

Poles were viewed by Nazis as subhuman non-Aryans, and during the German occupation of Poland 2.7 million ethnic Poles died. Polish civilians were subject to forced labour in German industry, internment, wholesale expulsions to make way for German colonists, and mass executions. The German authorities engaged in a systematic effort to destroy Polish culture and national identity. During operation AB-Aktion, many university professors and members of the Polish intelligentsia were arrested, transported to concentration camps, or executed. During the war, Poland lost an estimated 39 to 45 per cent of its physicians and dentists, 26 to 57 per cent of its lawyers, 15 to 30 per cent of its teachers, 30 to 40 per cent of its scientists and university professors, and 18 to 28 per cent of its clergy.

Mistreatment of Soviet POWs 

The Nazis captured 5.75 million Soviet prisoners of war, more than they took from all the other Allied powers combined. Of these, they killed an estimated 3.3 million, with 2.8 million of them being killed between June 1941 and January 1942. Many POWs starved to death or resorted to cannibalism while being held in open-air pens at Auschwitz and elsewhere.

From 1942 onward, Soviet POWs were viewed as a source of forced labour, and received better treatment so they could work. By December 1944, 750,000 Soviet POWs were working, including in German armaments factories (in violation of the Hague and Geneva conventions), mines, and farms.

Society

Education 

Antisemitic legislation passed in 1933 led to the removal of all Jewish teachers, professors, and officials from the education system. Most teachers were required to belong to the Nationalsozialistischer Lehrerbund (NSLB; National Socialist Teachers League) and university professors were required to join the National Socialist German Lecturers. Teachers had to take an oath of loyalty and obedience to Hitler, and those who failed to show sufficient conformity to party ideals were often reported by students or fellow teachers and dismissed. Lack of funding for salaries led to many teachers leaving the profession. The average class size increased from 37 in 1927 to 43 in 1938 due to the resulting teacher shortage.

Frequent and often contradictory directives were issued by Interior Minister Wilhelm Frick, Bernhard Rust of the Reich Ministry of Science, Education and Culture, and other agencies regarding content of lessons and acceptable textbooks for use in primary and secondary schools. Books deemed unacceptable to the regime were removed from school libraries. Indoctrination in Nazi ideology was made compulsory in January 1934. Students selected as future members of the party elite were indoctrinated from the age of 12 at Adolf Hitler Schools for primary education and National Political Institutes of Education for secondary education. Detailed indoctrination of future holders of elite military rank was undertaken at Order Castles.

Primary and secondary education focused on racial biology, population policy, culture, geography, and physical fitness. The curriculum in most subjects, including biology, geography, and even arithmetic, was altered to change the focus to race. Military education became the central component of physical education, and education in physics was oriented toward subjects with military applications, such as ballistics and aerodynamics. Students were required to watch all films prepared by the school division of the Reich Ministry of Public Enlightenment and Propaganda.

At universities, appointments to top posts were the subject of power struggles between the education ministry, the university boards, and the National Socialist German Students' League. In spite of pressure from the League and various government ministries, most university professors did not make changes to their lectures or syllabus during the Nazi period. This was especially true of universities located in predominantly Catholic regions. Enrolment at German universities declined from 104,000 students in 1931 to 41,000 in 1939, but enrolment in medical schools rose sharply as Jewish doctors had been forced to leave the profession, so medical graduates had good job prospects. From 1934, university students were required to attend frequent and time-consuming military training sessions run by the SA. First-year students also had to serve six months in a labour camp for the Reich Labour Service; an additional ten weeks service were required of second-year students.

Role of women and family 

Women were a cornerstone of Nazi social policy. The Nazis opposed the feminist movement, claiming that it was the creation of Jewish intellectuals, instead advocating a patriarchal society in which the German woman would recognise that her "world is her husband, her family, her children, and her home". Feminist groups were shut down or incorporated into the National Socialist Women's League, which coordinated groups throughout the country to promote motherhood and household activities. Courses were offered on childrearing, sewing, and cooking. Prominent feminists, including Anita Augspurg, Lida Gustava Heymann, and Helene Stöcker, felt forced to live in exile. The League published the NS-Frauen-Warte, the only Nazi-approved women's magazine in Nazi Germany; despite some propaganda aspects, it was predominantly an ordinary woman's magazine.

Women were encouraged to leave the workforce, and the creation of large families by racially suitable women was promoted through a propaganda campaign. Women received a bronze award—known as the Ehrenkreuz der Deutschen Mutter (Cross of Honour of the German Mother)—for giving birth to four children, silver for six, and gold for eight or more. Large families received subsidies to help with expenses. Though the measures led to increases in the birth rate, the number of families having four or more children declined by five per cent between 1935 and 1940. Removing women from the workforce did not have the intended effect of freeing up jobs for men, as women were for the most part employed as domestic servants, weavers, or in the food and drink industries—jobs that were not of interest to men. Nazi philosophy prevented large numbers of women from being hired to work in munitions factories in the build-up to the war, so foreign labourers were brought in. After the war started, slave labourers were extensively used. In January 1943, Hitler signed a decree requiring all women under the age of fifty to report for work assignments to help the war effort. Thereafter women were funnelled into agricultural and industrial jobs, and by September 1944 14.9 million women were working in munitions production.

Nazi leaders endorsed the idea that rational and theoretical work was alien to a woman's nature, and as such discouraged women from seeking higher education. A law passed in April 1933 limited the number of females admitted to university to ten per cent of the number of male attendees. This resulted in female enrolment in secondary schools dropping from 437,000 in 1926 to 205,000 in 1937. The number of women enrolled in post-secondary schools dropped from 128,000 in 1933 to 51,000 in 1938. However, with the requirement that men be enlisted into the armed forces during the war, women comprised half of the enrolment in the post-secondary system by 1944.

Women were expected to be strong, healthy, and vital. The sturdy peasant woman who worked the land and bore strong children was considered ideal, and women were praised for being athletic and tanned from working outdoors. Organisations were created for the indoctrination of Nazi values. From 25 March 1939 membership in the Hitler Youth was made compulsory for all children over the age of ten. The Jungmädelbund (Young Girls League) section of the Hitler Youth was for girls age 10 to 14 and the Bund Deutscher Mädel (BDM; League of German Girls) was for young women age 14 to 18. The BDM's activities focused on physical education, with activities such as running, long jumping, somersaulting, tightrope walking, marching, and swimming.

The Nazi regime promoted a liberal code of conduct regarding sexual matters and was sympathetic to women who bore children out of wedlock. Promiscuity increased as the war progressed, with unmarried soldiers often intimately involved with several women simultaneously. Soldier's wives were frequently involved in extramarital relationships. Sex was sometimes used as a commodity to obtain better work from a foreign labourer. Pamphlets enjoined German women to avoid sexual relations with foreign workers as a danger to their blood.

With Hitler's approval, Himmler intended that the new society of the Nazi regime should destigmatise illegitimate births, particularly of children fathered by members of the SS, who were vetted for racial purity. His hope was that each SS family would have between four and six children. The Lebensborn (Fountain of Life) association, founded by Himmler in 1935, created a series of maternity homes to accommodate single mothers during their pregnancies. Both parents were examined for racial suitability before acceptance. The resulting children were often adopted into SS families. The homes were also made available to the wives of SS and Nazi Party members, who quickly filled over half the available spots.

Existing laws banning abortion except for medical reasons were strictly enforced by the Nazi regime. The number of abortions declined from 35,000 per year at the start of the 1930s to fewer than 2,000 per year at the end of the decade, though in 1935 a law was passed allowing abortions for eugenics reasons.

Health 

Nazi Germany had a strong anti-tobacco movement, as pioneering research by Franz H. Müller in 1939 demonstrated a causal link between smoking and lung cancer. The Reich Health Office took measures to try to limit smoking, including producing lectures and pamphlets. Smoking was banned in many workplaces, on trains, and among on-duty members of the military. Government agencies also worked to control other carcinogenic substances such as asbestos and pesticides. As part of a general public health campaign, water supplies were cleaned up, lead and mercury were removed from consumer products, and women were urged to undergo regular screenings for breast cancer.

Government-run health care insurance plans were available, but Jews were denied coverage starting in 1933. That same year, Jewish doctors were forbidden to treat government-insured patients. In 1937, Jewish doctors were forbidden to treat non-Jewish patients, and in 1938 their right to practice medicine was removed entirely.

Medical experiments, many of them pseudoscientific, were performed on concentration camp inmates beginning in 1941. The most notorious doctor to perform medical experiments was SS-Hauptsturmführer Dr. Josef Mengele, camp doctor at Auschwitz. Many of his victims died. Concentration camp inmates were made available for purchase by pharmaceutical companies for drug testing and other experiments.

Environmentalism 

Nazi society had elements supportive of animal rights and many people were fond of zoos and wildlife. The government took several measures to ensure the protection of animals and the environment. In 1933, the Nazis enacted a stringent animal-protection law that affected what was allowed for medical research. The law was only loosely enforced, and in spite of a ban on vivisection, the Ministry of the Interior readily handed out permits for experiments on animals.

The Reich Forestry Office under Göring enforced regulations that required foresters to plant a variety of trees to ensure suitable habitat for wildlife, and a new Reich Animal Protection Act became law in 1933. The regime enacted the Reich Nature Protection Act in 1935 to protect the natural landscape from excessive economic development. It allowed for the expropriation of privately owned land to create nature preserves and aided in long-range planning. Perfunctory efforts were made to curb air pollution, but little enforcement of existing legislation was undertaken once the war began.

Religion 

When the Nazis seized power in 1933, roughly 67 per cent of the population of Germany was Protestant, 33 per cent was Roman Catholic, while Jews made up less than 1 per cent. According to 1939 census, 54 per cent considered themselves Protestant, 40 per cent Roman Catholic, 3.5 per cent Gottgläubig (God-believing; a Nazi religious movement) and 1.5 per cent nonreligious. Nazi Germany extensively employed Christian imagery and instituted a variety of new Christian holidays and celebrations, such as a massive celebration marking the 1200th anniversary of the birth of Frankish emperor Charlemagne, who Christianized neighbouring continental Germanic peoples by force during the Saxon Wars. Nazi propaganda stylised Hitler as a Christ-like messiah, a "figure of redemption according to the Christian model", "who would liberate the world from the Antichrist".

Under the Gleichschaltung process, Hitler attempted to create a unified Protestant Reich Church from Germany's 28 existing Protestant state churches. Pro-Nazi Ludwig Müller was installed as Reich Bishop and the pro-Nazi pressure group German Christians gained control of the new church. They objected to the Old Testament because of its Jewish origins and demanded that converted Jews be barred from their church. Pastor Martin Niemöller responded with the formation of the Confessing Church, from which some clergymen opposed the Nazi regime. When in 1935 the Confessing Church synod protested the Nazi policy on religion, 700 of their pastors were arrested. Müller resigned and Hitler appointed Hanns Kerrl as Minister for Church Affairs to continue efforts to control Protestantism. In 1936, a Confessing Church envoy protested to Hitler against the religious persecutions and human rights abuses. Hundreds more pastors were arrested. The church continued to resist and by early 1937 Hitler abandoned his hope of uniting the Protestant churches. Niemöller was arrested on 1 July 1937 and spent most of the next seven years in Sachsenhausen concentration camp and Dachau. Theological universities were closed and pastors and theologians of other Protestant denominations were also arrested.

Persecution of the Catholic Church in Germany followed the Nazi takeover. Hitler moved quickly to eliminate political Catholicism, rounding up functionaries of the Catholic-aligned Bavarian People's Party and Catholic Centre Party, which along with all other non-Nazi political parties ceased to exist by July. The Reichskonkordat (Reich Concordat) treaty with the Vatican was signed in 1933, amid continuing harassment of the church in Germany. The treaty required the regime to honour the independence of Catholic institutions and prohibited clergy from involvement in politics. Hitler routinely disregarded the Concordat, closing all Catholic institutions whose functions were not strictly religious. Clergy, nuns and lay leaders were targeted, with thousands of arrests over the ensuing years, often on trumped-up charges of currency smuggling or immorality. Several Catholic leaders were targeted in the 1934 Night of the Long Knives assassinations. Most Catholic youth groups refused to dissolve themselves and Hitler Youth leader Baldur von Schirach encouraged members to attack Catholic boys in the streets. Propaganda campaigns claimed the church was corrupt, restrictions were placed on public meetings and Catholic publications faced censorship. Catholic schools were required to reduce religious instruction and crucifixes were removed from state buildings.

Pope Pius XI had the "Mit brennender Sorge" ("With Burning Concern") encyclical smuggled into Germany for Passion Sunday 1937 and read from every pulpit as it denounced the systematic hostility of the regime toward the church. In response, Goebbels renewed the regime's crackdown and propaganda against Catholics. Enrolment in denominational schools dropped sharply and by 1939 all such schools were disbanded or converted to public facilities. Later Catholic protests included the 22 March 1942 pastoral letter by the German bishops on "The Struggle against Christianity and the Church". About 30 per cent of Catholic priests were disciplined by police during the Nazi era. A vast security network spied on the activities of clergy and priests were frequently denounced, arrested or sent to concentration camps – many to the dedicated clergy barracks at Dachau. In the areas of Poland annexed in 1939, the Nazis instigated a brutal suppression and systematic dismantling of the Catholic Church.

Alfred Rosenberg, head of the Nazi Party Office of Foreign Affairs and Hitler's appointed cultural and educational leader for Nazi Germany, considered Catholicism to be among the Nazis' chief enemies. He planned the "extermination of the foreign Christian faiths imported into Germany", and for the Bible and Christian cross to be replaced in all churches, cathedrals, and chapels with copies of Mein Kampf and the swastika. Other sects of Christianity were also targeted, with Chief of the Nazi Party Chancellery Martin Bormann publicly proclaiming in 1941, "National Socialism and Christianity are irreconcilable."

Resistance to the regime 

While no unified resistance movement opposing the Nazi regime existed, acts of defiance such as sabotage and labour slowdowns took place, as well as attempts to overthrow the regime or assassinate Hitler. The banned Communist and Social Democratic parties set up resistance networks in the mid-1930s. These networks achieved little beyond fomenting unrest and initiating short-lived strikes. Carl Friedrich Goerdeller, who initially supported Hitler, changed his mind in 1936 and was later a participant in the July 20 plot. The Red Orchestra spy ring provided information to the Allies about Nazi war crimes, helped orchestrate escapes from Germany, and distributed leaflets. The group was detected by the Gestapo and more than 50 members were tried and executed in 1942. Communist and Social Democratic resistance groups resumed activity in late 1942, but were unable to achieve much beyond distributing leaflets. The two groups saw themselves as potential rival parties in post-war Germany, and for the most part did not co-ordinate their activities. The White Rose resistance group was primarily active in 1942–43, and many of its members were arrested or executed, with the final arrests taking place in 1944. Another civilian resistance group, the Kreisau Circle, had some connections with the military conspirators, and many of its members were arrested after the failed 20 July plot.

While civilian efforts had an impact on public opinion, the army was the only organisation with the capacity to overthrow the government. A major plot by men in the upper echelons of the military originated in 1938. They believed Britain would go to war over Hitler's planned invasion of Czechoslovakia, and Germany would lose. The plan was to overthrow Hitler or possibly assassinate him. Participants included Generaloberst Ludwig Beck, Generaloberst Walther von Brauchitsch, Generaloberst Franz Halder, Admiral Wilhelm Canaris, and Generalleutnant Erwin von Witzleben, who joined a conspiracy headed by Oberstleutnant Hans Oster and Major Helmuth Groscurth of the Abwehr. The planned coup was cancelled after the signing of the Munich Agreement in September 1938. Many of the same people were involved in a coup planned for 1940, but again the participants changed their minds and backed down, partly because of the popularity of the regime after the early victories in the war. Attempts to assassinate Hitler resumed in earnest in 1943, with Henning von Tresckow joining Oster's group and attempting to blow up Hitler's plane in 1943. Several more attempts followed before the failed 20 July 1944 plot, which was at least partly motivated by the increasing prospect of a German defeat in the war. The plot, part of Operation Valkyrie, involved Claus von Stauffenberg planting a bomb in the conference room at Wolf's Lair at Rastenburg. Hitler, who narrowly survived, later ordered savage reprisals resulting in the execution of more than 4,900 people.

Around 1940 a resistance group formed around the priest Heinrich Maier. The group passed on locations of production facilities for V-2 rockets, Tiger tanks, and aircraft to the Allies from late 1943 onwards. Allied bombers used this information to carry out air attacks. The Maier group provided information about the mass murder of Jews very early on; these reports were not initially believed by the Allies. The resistance group was uncovered and most of its members were imprisoned, tortured, or killed.

Culture 

The regime promoted the concept of Volksgemeinschaft, a national German ethnic community. The goal was to build a classless society based on racial purity and the perceived need to prepare for warfare, conquest and a struggle against Marxism. The German Labour Front founded the Kraft durch Freude (KdF; Strength Through Joy) organisation in 1933. As well as taking control of tens of thousands of privately run recreational clubs, it offered highly regimented holidays and entertainment such as cruises, vacation destinations and concerts.

The Reichskulturkammer (Reich Chamber of Culture) was organised under the control of the Propaganda Ministry in September 1933. Sub-chambers were set up to control aspects of cultural life such as film, radio, newspapers, fine arts, music, theatre and literature. Members of these professions were required to join their respective organisation. Jews and people considered politically unreliable were prevented from working in the arts, and many emigrated. Books and scripts had to be approved by the Propaganda Ministry prior to publication. Standards deteriorated as the regime sought to use cultural outlets exclusively as propaganda media.

Radio became popular in Germany during the 1930s; over 70 per cent of households owned a receiver by 1939, more than any other country. By July 1933, radio station staffs were purged of leftists and others deemed undesirable. Propaganda and speeches were typical radio fare immediately after the seizure of power, but as time went on Goebbels insisted that more music be played so that listeners would not turn to foreign broadcasters for entertainment.

Censorship 

Newspapers, like other media, were controlled by the state; the Reich Press Chamber shut down or bought newspapers and publishing houses. By 1939, over two-thirds of the newspapers and magazines were directly owned by the Propaganda Ministry. The Nazi Party daily newspaper, the Völkischer Beobachter ("Ethnic Observer"), was edited by Rosenberg, who also wrote The Myth of the Twentieth Century, a book of racial theories espousing Nordic superiority. Goebbels controlled the wire services and insisted that all newspapers in Germany only publish content favourable to the regime. Under Goebbels, the Propaganda Ministry issued two dozen directives every week on exactly what news should be published and what angles to use; the typical newspaper followed the directives closely, especially regarding what to omit. Newspaper readership plummeted, partly because of the decreased quality of the content and partly because of the surge in popularity of radio. Propaganda became less effective towards the end of the war, as people were able to obtain information outside of official channels.

Authors of books left the country in droves and some wrote material critical of the regime while in exile. Goebbels recommended that the remaining authors concentrate on books themed on Germanic myths and the concept of blood and soil. By the end of 1933, over a thousand books—most of them by Jewish authors or featuring Jewish characters—had been banned by the Nazi regime. Nazi book burnings took place; nineteen such events were held on the night of 10 May 1933. Tens of thousands of books from dozens of figures, including Albert Einstein, Sigmund Freud, Helen Keller, Alfred Kerr, Marcel Proust, Erich Maria Remarque, Upton Sinclair, Jakob Wassermann, H. G. Wells, and Émile Zola were publicly burned. Pacifist works, and literature espousing liberal, democratic values were targeted for destruction, as well as any writings supporting the Weimar Republic or those written by Jewish authors.

Architecture and art 

Hitler took a personal interest in architecture and worked closely with state architects Paul Troost and Albert Speer to create public buildings in a neoclassical style based on Roman architecture. Speer constructed imposing structures such as the Nazi party rally grounds in Nuremberg and a new Reich Chancellery building in Berlin. Hitler's plans for rebuilding Berlin included a gigantic dome based on the Pantheon in Rome and a triumphal arch more than double the height of the Arc de Triomphe in Paris. Neither structure was built.

Hitler's belief that abstract, Dadaist, expressionist and modern art were decadent became the basis for policy. Many art museum directors lost their posts in 1933 and were replaced by party members. Some 6,500 modern works of art were removed from museums and replaced with works chosen by a Nazi jury. Exhibitions of the rejected pieces, under titles such as "Decadence in Art", were launched in sixteen different cities by 1935. The Degenerate Art Exhibition, organised by Goebbels, ran in Munich from July to November 1937. The exhibition proved wildly popular, attracting over two million visitors.

Composer Richard Strauss was appointed president of the Reichsmusikkammer (Reich Music Chamber) on its founding in November 1933. As was the case with other art forms, the Nazis ostracised musicians who were deemed racially unacceptable and for the most part disapproved of music that was too modern or atonal. Jazz was considered especially inappropriate and foreign jazz musicians left the country or were expelled. Hitler favoured the music of Richard Wagner, especially pieces based on Germanic myths and heroic stories, and attended the Bayreuth Festival each year from 1933 to 1942.

Film 

Movies were popular in Germany in the 1930s and 1940s, with admissions of over a billion people in 1942, 1943 and 1944. By 1934, German regulations restricting currency exports made it impossible for US film makers to take their profits back to America, so the major film studios closed their German branches. Exports of German films plummeted, as their antisemitic content made them impossible to show in other countries. The two largest film companies, Universum Film AG and Tobis, were purchased by the Propaganda Ministry, which by 1939 was producing most German films. The productions were not always overtly propagandistic, but generally had a political subtext and followed party lines regarding themes and content. Scripts were pre-censored.

Leni Riefenstahl's Triumph of the Will (1935)—documenting the 1934 Nuremberg Rally—and Olympia (1938)—covering the 1936 Summer Olympics—pioneered techniques of camera movement and editing that influenced later films. New techniques such as telephoto lenses and cameras mounted on tracks were employed. Both films remain controversial, as their aesthetic merit is inseparable from their propagandising of Nazi ideals.

Legacy 

The Allied powers organised war crimes trials, beginning with the Nuremberg trials, held from November 1945 to October 1946, of 23 top Nazi officials. They were charged with four counts—conspiracy to commit crimes, crimes against peace, war crimes and crimes against humanity—in violation of international laws governing warfare. All but three of the defendants were found guilty and twelve were sentenced to death. Twelve subsequent Nuremberg trials of 184 defendants were held between 1946 and 1949. Between 1946 and 1949, the Allies investigated 3,887 cases, of which 489 were brought to trial. The result was convictions of 1,426 people; 297 of these were sentenced to death and 279 to life in prison, with the remainder receiving lesser sentences. About 65 per cent of the death sentences were carried out. Poland was more active than other nations in investigating war crimes, for example prosecuting 673 of the total 789 Auschwitz staff brought to trial.

The political programme espoused by Hitler and the Nazis brought about a world war, leaving behind a devastated and impoverished Europe. Germany itself suffered wholesale destruction, characterised as Stunde Null (Zero Hour). The number of civilians killed during the Second World War was unprecedented in the history of warfare. As a result, Nazi ideology and the actions taken by the regime are almost universally regarded as gravely immoral. Historians, philosophers, and politicians often use the word "evil" to describe Hitler and the Nazi regime. Interest in Nazi Germany continues in the media and the academic world. While Evans remarks that the era "exerts an almost universal appeal because its murderous racism stands as a warning to the whole of humanity", young neo-Nazis enjoy the shock value that Nazi symbols or slogans provide. The display or use of Nazi symbolism such as flags, swastikas, or greetings is illegal in Germany and Austria.

Nazi Germany was succeeded by three states: West Germany (the Federal Republic of Germany or "FRG"), East Germany (the German Democratic Republic or "GRD"), and Austria.
The process of denazification, which was initiated by the Allies as a way to remove Nazi Party members was only partially successful, as the need for experts in such fields as medicine and engineering was too great. However, expression of Nazi views was frowned upon, and those who expressed such views were frequently dismissed from their jobs. From the immediate post-war period through the 1950s, people avoided talking about the Nazi regime or their own wartime experiences. While virtually every family suffered losses during the war has a story to tell, Germans kept quiet about their experiences and felt a sense of communal guilt, even if they were not directly involved in war crimes.

The trial of Adolf Eichmann in 1961 and the broadcast of the television miniseries Holocaust in 1979 brought the process of Vergangenheitsbewältigung (coping with the past) to the forefront for many Germans. Once study of Nazi Germany was introduced into the school curriculum starting in the 1970s, people began researching the experiences of their family members. Study of the era and a willingness to critically examine its mistakes has led to the development of a strong democracy in Germany, but with lingering undercurrents of antisemitism and neo-Nazi thought.

In 2017, a Körber Foundation survey found that just 47 per cent of 14 to 16-year-olds in Germany knew what Auschwitz was. The journalist Alan Posener attributed the country's "growing historical amnesia" in part to a failure by the German film and television industry to reflect the country's history accurately.

See also 

 Bibliography of Nazi Germany
 Collaboration with the Axis Powers
 European interwar dictatorships
 Glossary of Nazi Germany
 List of books about Nazi Germany
 List of books by or about Adolf Hitler
 List of Nazi Party leaders and officials
 Nazi songs
 Orders, decorations, and medals of Nazi Germany
 Sonderweg

References

Explanatory notes

Citations

Bibliography

External links 

 
 
 German Propaganda Archive hosted by Calvin College

 
.

.

20th century in Germany by period
Articles containing video clips
Axis powers
Germany
Former countries in Europe
Former empires
Modern history of Germany
Natalism
Nazism
States and territories disestablished in 1945
States and territories established in 1933
Totalitarian states